Tessa Rumsey (1970) is an American poet based in San Francisco.

Her poems have appeared in Colorado Review, Denver Quarterly, Fence, The New Republic. She is a graduate in 1992 in Philosophy from Sarah Lawrence College. Later studying at the Iowa Writers’ Workshop where she received an MFA and in 2002 she received an MA in Visual and Critical Studies at California College of the Arts.

Work
 "Everlasting Gobstopper", Slope 10
 "June Inside You", Electronic Poetry Review, Spring 2001
 "April Fools", Electronic Poetry Review, Spring 2001

Ploughshares literary journal

Awards 
1998 – Contemporary Poetry Series Competition, for Assembling the Shepherd
 2004 – Barnard Women Poets Prize

References

Year of birth missing (living people)
Living people
California College of the Arts alumni
Iowa Writers' Workshop alumni
American women poets
Sarah Lawrence College alumni
21st-century American women